"Sing for the Day'" is the second single that Styx released from their album Pieces of Eight. It reached #41 on the U.S. Billboard Hot 100 pop singles chart in February 1979. It was later the B-side of their next single “Renegade”. Tommy Shaw used the name ‘Hannah’ in the song, to represent his fans. Several years later, he named his newborn daughter Hannah. The album version that lasts 4:57, was edited down to 3:40 for the single version.

Reviewing the single version, Billboard felt that the "swirling keyboards and searing guitars" made it sound like a Yes song.  Cash Box said that it has "a bright soaring vocal arrangement and musical backing of acoustic guitars, mandolin, tambourine, moderate beat and excellent synthesizer work." Record World said that "The strong vocal harmony hook is pop perfect."

A promotional video was filmed directed by Bruce Gowers which has Styx playing on stage with Tommy Shaw on mandolin and vocals, James "J.Y." Young on acoustic guitar (even though he does not play on the track), Chuck and John Panozzo on bass guitars and drums respectively, and Dennis DeYoung on tambourine and backing vocals (for the band performance scenes) and keyboards (during the keyboard solos).

Personnel
Tommy Shaw - lead vocals, guitar, mandolin, autoharp
Dennis DeYoung - keyboards, backing vocals
Chuck Panozzo - bass guitar
John Panozzo - drums, percussion

References

1978 songs
1979 singles
Songs written by Tommy Shaw
Styx (band) songs
Music videos directed by Bruce Gowers
A&M Records singles